Interactive cinema tries to give an audience an active role in the showing of movies.

Another newer definition of interactive cinema is a video game which is a hybrid between participation and viewing, giving the player – or viewer, as it were – a strong amount of control in the characters' decisions. It is compared to interactive film.

This form of media recently has become more relevant. Companies like Netflix have even began coming out with releases that have this different way of consumption.

History
The earliest rudimentary examples of interactive cinema date back to the early 20th century, with "cinematic shooting gallery" games. They were similar to shooting gallery carnival games, except that players shot at a cinema screen displaying film footage of targets. They showed footage of targets, and when a player shot the screen at the right time, it would trigger a mechanism that temporarily pauses the film and registers a point. The first successful example of such a game was Life Targets, released in the United Kingdom in 1912. Cinematic shooting gallery games enjoyed short-lived popularity in several parts of Britain during the 1910s, and often had safari animals as targets, with footage recorded from British imperial colonies. Cinematic shooting gallery games declined some time after the 1910s.

The 1967 Czech film Kinoautomat by Czechoslovakian director Raduz Cincera (presented in the Czech Pavilion at Expo 67 in Montreal) is the first cinema-like interactive movie. The availability of computers for the display of interactive video has made it easier to produce interactive movies.

A prominent pioneer of interactive cinema games is the successful Hideo Kojima (1963–present), whose gameplay often takes a priority to the storyline and long cutscenes. His 1994 game Policenauts, a point-and-click adventure game which has shootout sequences (that make use of the lightgun peripheral on the Sega Saturn version of the game), has a subtitle which reads "Interactive cinema" on the cover art of all versions of said game, which provides an early example of a prominent  game-developer labelling a game as such. In 1999 Sega's Shenmue video game series won high praise for its implementation of interactive cinematic elements. Its designer Yu Suzuki stated that his goal "was to create a game that was intricate and lifelike by merging the cinematic qualities of movies and the interactivity of computer games". A recent incarnation of an idea similar to this one is Fahrenheit (censored version released in the US and Canada as Indigo Prophecy) – a game dubbed as "interactive cinema" by its France-based developer, Quantic Dream.

The first American interactive film released in 1992, I'm Your Man. Certain Loews Theatres locations retrofitted with controllers allowed audiences to vote on decisions made by the main character. Although initially touted as the first step toward virtual-reality cinema, the experiment proved a failure, the equipment was removed from theaters by 1994.

See also
 Cutscene
 Interactive art
 Interaction design
 Interactive movie
 Interactive video
 Laserdisc video game
 Participatory cinema
 Web documentary

References

 Cinema